The 2012 KBS Drama Awards is a ceremony honoring the outstanding achievement in television on the Korean Broadcasting System (KBS) network for the year of 2012. It was held on December 31, 2012 and hosted by actors Yoo Jun-sang, Lee Jong-suk and actress Youn Yuh-jung.

Nominations and winners
(Winners denoted in bold)

References

External links
KBS 2012 Awards

KBS Drama Awards
KBS Drama Awards
KBS Drama Awards